János Mátyus (born 20 December 1974) is a Hungarian professional association football coach and a former full-back. He is the manager of Budafok.

International career
He made his debut for the Hungary national team in 1998, and made 34 appearances and scored three goals between then and 2002.

References

External links 
 
 

1974 births
Sportspeople from Győr
Living people
Hungarian footballers
Hungary under-21 international footballers
Hungary international footballers
Association football defenders
Budapest Honvéd FC players
Ferencvárosi TC footballers
FC Energie Cottbus players
Hibernian F.C. players
FC Admira Wacker Mödling players
Győri ETO FC players
FC Tatabánya players
Bundesliga players
2. Bundesliga players
Scottish Premier League players
Hungarian expatriate footballers
Hungarian expatriate sportspeople in Germany
Expatriate footballers in Germany
Hungarian expatriate sportspeople in Scotland
Expatriate footballers in Scotland
Hungarian expatriate sportspeople in Austria
Expatriate footballers in Austria
Hungarian football managers
Szombathelyi Haladás football managers
Nyíregyháza Spartacus FC managers
Soproni VSE managers
Nemzeti Bajnokság I managers